The Hoosier Schoolmaster is a 1924 American silent drama film directed by Oliver L. Sellers and starring Henry Hull, Jane Thomas, and Frank Dane. It is an adaptation of the novel The Hoosier Schoolmaster by Edward Eggleston. The film was remade as a post-Civil War talkie in 1935.

Plot
As described in a film magazine review, during pre-Civil War days, Ralph Hartsook is the headmaster in the Flat Creek School District of Indiana. Hannah Thompson works for the family where Ralph boards. They fall in love. An epidemic of night robberies breaks out and Ralph is suspected of being the criminal. After a variety of adventures and with the aid of Bud Means, Ralph establishes his innocense, confounds his enemies, and weds Hannah.

Cast

Preservation
A print of The Hoosier Schoolmaster with one reel missing is held at the UCLA Film and Television Archive and Library of Congress.

References

Bibliography
 Darby, William. Masters of Lens and Light: A Checklist of Major Cinematographers and Their Feature Films. Scarecrow Press, 1991.

External links

Stills at moviessilently.com

1924 films
1924 drama films
1920s English-language films
American silent feature films
Silent American drama films
American black-and-white films
Films directed by Oliver L. Sellers
Producers Distributing Corporation films
1920s American films